Sir Geoffrey Granville Whiskard  (19 August 1886 – 19 May 1957) was a British civil servant and diplomat.

Early life and education
Whiskard was born at 3 Hartington Villas, Penge Road, Beckenham, Kent, to Ernest Whiskard, a local bank manager, and Lucy Marian Sutton, daughter of a political analyst. Shortly after, the family moved to Kensington because Geoffrey's father had been appointed manager of the Capital and Counties Bank's local branch.

Whiskard was educated at St Paul's School, London, and then in December 1904 he won a scholarship to Wadham College, Oxford, going up in October of the next year. He gained first class in Mods and Greats, graduating in 1909.

Career 
Whiskard entered the Home Office in 1911 and served as an Assistant Secretary to the Chief Secretary for Ireland during the Anglo-Irish War, then in the Colonial Office 1922–1925 and in the Dominions Office 1925–1935. He was High Commissioner to Australia 1936–1941, and Permanent Secretary at the Ministry of Works 1941–1943 and at the Ministry of Town and Country Planning 1943–1946.

Personal life 
In 1915, he married Cynthia Reeves, having three children Richard, Mary and John. On 30 July 1940, his wife died of heart failure brought on by a severe asthma attack whilst visiting Sydney. Whiskard later remarried to Eileen Margaret Anderson after he had retired from government.

Writings 
In 1947, Letters from a Civil Servant to his Son was published. Whiskard had decided the keep his name anonymous. The letters in Whiskard's book are addressed to Richard, the oldest son, and chronicle major parts of his life whilst covering heartfelt themes of love and war. His leaving school, enrolling in Oxford University and at the outbreak of the Second World War, where he joined the Welsh Guards. It was here Richard became friends with the esteemed painter Rex Whistler. Lieutenant Richard Whiskard died on Wednesday, 2 August 1944, at the age of 24.

References

Sources
WHISKARD, Sir Geoffrey (Granville), Who Was Who, A. & C. Black, 1920–2015; online edn, Oxford University Press, 2014.

1886 births
1957 deaths
Alumni of Wadham College, Oxford
People educated at Westminster School, London
High Commissioners of the United Kingdom to Australia
British Permanent Secretaries
Knights Commander of the Order of the Bath
Knights Commander of the Order of St Michael and St George